Immunity is a solo album by Rupert Hine.  Originally released in 1981, re-released and digitally remastered in 2001. The album was dedicated to Liam Byrne. The song "Misplaced Love" features a brief chorus by British singer Marianne Faithfull.

Track listing
All tracks composed by Rupert Hine and Jeannette Obstoj

"I Hang On to My Vertigo"
"Misplaced Love"
"Samsara"
"Surface Tension"
"I Think a Man Will Hang Soon"
"Immunity"
"Another Stranger"
"Psycho Surrender"
"Make a Wish"
Bonus tracks
2001 CD reissue
"Scratching at Success"
"Introduction to the Menace"

Charts

Personnel
Rupert Hine - vocals, keyboards, instrumentation, sound processing
Phil Palmer - guitar
Phil Collins - percussion on "Immunity" and "Another Stranger"
Marianne Faithfull - vocals on "Misplaced Love"
Trevor Morais - drums on "I Think a Man Will Hang Soon", percussion on "Another Stranger" and "Make a Wish"
Geoffrey Richardson - viola on "Make a Wish"
Ollie W. Tayler - clarinet and recorder on "Psycho Surrender"
Technical
Stephen W Tayler - engineering, mixing and co-production
Michael Ross - art direction, design
Chris Parker - photography, treatments

References 

Rupert Hine albums
1981 albums
Albums produced by Rupert Hine
A&M Records albums